Frizzell is a surname. Notable people with the surname include:

Alan Frizzell (born 1995), Scottish footballer
Colin Frizzell (born 1971), Canadian author of young adult novels
David Frizzell (born 1941), American country music singer
David Frizzell (Indiana politician), Republican member of the Indiana House of Representatives
Dick Frizzell (born 1943), New Zealand artist
Donald L. Frizzell (1906–1972), American paleontologist, geologist and malacologist
Gregory Kent Frizzell (born 1956), United States federal judge for the United States District Court for the Northern District of Oklahoma
Henry F. Frizzell (1839–1904), Union Army soldier and Medal of Honor recipient
Jimmy Frizzell (1937–2016), former Scottish association football player and manager
John Frizzell (born in Kingston, Ontario), Canadian screenwriter and film producer
John Frizzell (composer) (born 1966), American film and television composer
Lefty Frizzell (1928–1975), American country music singer, songwriter and exponent of honky tonk music
Lou Frizzell (1919–1979), American actor and music director
Mary Frizzell (1913–1972), Canadian athlete who competed in the 1932 Summer Olympics
William Frizzell (born 1962), former American football defensive back

See also
Frizzell Hotsprings, hot spring on the south bank of the Skeena River, near Prince Rupert, British Columbia, Canada
Andrew P. Frizzell House and Farm Complex, historic home and farm complex at Westminster, Carroll County, Maryland, United States
McMurray-Frizzell-Aldridge Farm, historic home and farm complex located at Westminster, Carroll County, Maryland, United States
Frisell
Frizzle (disambiguation)